The 1919–20 Boston College men's ice hockey season was the 3rd season of play for the program.

Season
With the vast majority of interested colleges ready to go for the 1919–20 season, Boston College was finally able to play a full schedule of games. While that amounted to just 7 games that was still more than they had played over the previous two seasons combined. After beginning with a win over the Yankee Division Club team, BC dropped a three overtime game to Massachusetts Agricultural College, one of the top second-tier schools. Ten days later the team lost again, this time to MIT after the rematch with MAC had to be scrubbed.

The losses lit a fire under the players who ran roughshod over their next three opponents, posting three consecutive shutouts. Even when they did finally surrender a goal, BC refused to lose for the remainder of the season and finished with a 6–2 record. Despite the success, former team captain Walter Falvey stepped down as head coach after the season in favor of the more experienced Fred Rocque.

Note: Boston College's athletic programs weren't known as the 'Eagles' until 1920.

Roster

Standings

Schedule and Results

|-
!colspan=12 style=";" | Regular Season

References

Boston College Eagles men's ice hockey seasons
Boston College
Boston College
Boston College
Boston College